The Stadium of Ksar is a sports field in northeastern Nouakchott, Mauritania. It is located to the northeast of the Presidential Palace, near the Old Fort and College d'Applicatio.

References

Sport in Nouakchott
Sports venues in Mauritania